Muhovo is a village in Ihtiman Municipality in Sofia Province, western Bulgaria with a population of 138.

Geography 

The village is located in the mountain of Sredna Gora, on the southern edge of the Topolnitsa Reservoir, at 22 km to the east of Ihtiman. Muhovo is in the vicinity of the villages of Lesichovo and Tserovo. The surrounding region has a soft microclimate due to the reservoir and the southern slopes of the mountain. There are 280 sunny day annually which is above the average for Bulgaria.

History 

Before the construction of the dam the village was located on the banks of the Topolnitsa River. During the April Uprising the Flying Band of Georgi Benkovski passed through the villages of Oborishte, Poibrene and Muhovo. In Muhovo over 40 people volunteered to join Benkovski. Many people from the village took part in the September Uprising of 1923.

Religion 

Currently a new church named after Saint George is under construction. The old church is now underwater in the reservoir and used to have a large yard and a separate belfry.

Gallery

External links 
 www.muhovo.info — Information for Muhovo

Footnotes 

Villages in Sofia Province